QatarDebate, a member of Qatar Foundation and the National Debating Organisation for Qatar, is a civic engagement initiative which aims to develop and support the standard of open discussion and debate among students and youth in Qatar and the broader Arab world.

History
QatarDebate was established in 2008 under the direction of Moza bint Nasser, chairperson of Qatar Foundation, with support from the team behind the Doha Debates.

QatarDebate's aim is to "shape the global citizens of today and the intellectual leaders of tomorrow in Qatar and the region" through the introduction of a variety of English and Arabic debate programs.

Programs and activities 
The center selected and helped coach members of the Qatar National Debate Team for the 2008 and 2009 editions of the World Schools Debating Championships. In both editions, the team won four out of their eight debates. The team equaled Lithuania's record in the 2008 championships for the number of debates won by a team in its inaugural appearance.

In April 2009, two national forums were simultaneously organized by QatarDebate: the Qatar National Schools Debating Championship and Qatar National Universities Debating Championships.

QatarDebate was awarded the rights to host the 2010 World Schools Debating Championships, becoming the first Arab-based society to do so. The event was launched on 9 February 2010 and featured teams from 57 countries.

A biennial event known as the International Universities Arabic Debating Championship is held under the auspices of QatarDebate. The first edition was held in 2011, followed by two more editions in 2013 and 2015. The championship features students from international universities who debate predetermined topics. The 2015 edition, which featured teams from 33 countries, was the first to include universities from non-Arabic countries.

Films
QatarDebate was involved in the filming of a documentary film on the first Qatar National Schools Debating Team (2008) entitled “Team Qatar”, directed by Liz Mermin, which won an award at the 2009 Doha Tribeca Film Festival. The center also produced an instructional film on debating for use by members of the society, entitled “QatarDebate Introduction to Debating”.

Publications
In 2013, the center released a dictionary with Arabic and English debate terminology. Along with definitions of each term, the book highlights their application in debates by providing examples of their use.

Other publications released by the center include Al Murshed Book and the Introduction to the Art of Debating Book.

References

External links 
QatarDebate
The International Universities Arabic Debating Championships (IUADCs).
United States Arabic Universities Debating Championship.
Asian Arabic Debating Championship for universities, organized by QatarDebate in collaboration with the International Islamic University of Malaysia with the involvement of the Malaysian Ministry of Education and the Ministry of Youth and Sports as strategic partners.'
Read QatarDebate News
Read QatarDebate Events

Debating societies
Clubs and societies in Qatar
International conferences in Qatar
Political debates